Sleuth is a board game published by 3M in 1971.

Gameplay
Sleuth is a strategy deduction card game.

Reviews
1982 Games 100 in Games
Games & Puzzles No. 20
Jeux & Stratégie No. 59 (as "La Chasse aux Diamants")

References

External links
 

3M bookshelf game series
Board games introduced in 1971